The Rocheuse river (English: Rocky River) is a tributary of the rivière du Malin, located in the unorganized territory of Lac-Jacques-Cartier, in the La Côte-de-Beaupré Regional County Municipality, in the administrative region of Capitale-Nationale, in Quebec, Canada. The course of the river passes in particular in the Laurentides Wildlife Reserve.

Forestry is the main economic activity in the sector; recreational tourism, second.

The surface of the Rocheuse River (except the rapids areas) is generally frozen from the beginning of December to the end of March, but the safe circulation on the ice is generally made from the end of December to the beginning of March.

Geography 
The main watersheds adjacent to the Rocky River are:
 north side: rivière du Malin, Jacques-Cartier River;
 east side: Fragasso Lake, Sautauriski Lake, Montmorency River;
 south side: Fragasso Lake, Sautauriski Lake, Walsh Lake, Rivière à la Chute (Jacques-Cartier River);
 west side: rivière du Malin, Jacques-Cartier River, Rivière Jacques-Cartier Nord-Ouest.

The Rocheuse river originates at the confluence of two mountain streams , located in the unorganized territory of Lac-Jacques-Cartier, in the regional county municipality (MRC) La Côte-de-Beaupré Regional County Municipality.

  to the south, forming a large curve towards the east, to an unidentified stream (coming from the north);
  towards the south by forming a first hook towards the west and a second at the end of the segment where the river branches off towards the west before crossing on  the Bradette Lake to its mouth;
  to the south, forming a few streamers, to a long bay on the eastern shore of Lac des Alliés;
  westwards crossing Lac des Alliés, bypassing a large peninsula attached to the south shore, to the Allies dam built at the mouth of the lake;
  westward across a series of rapids at the end of the segment to a bend in the river;
  to the north, crossing two long series of rapids, to its mouth.

Toponymy 
The toponym "rivière Rocheuse" was formalized on December 5, 1968 at the Place Names Bank of the Commission de toponymie du Québec.

Notes and references

See also 

 Laurentides Wildlife Reserve
 Lac-Jacques-Cartier, a TNO
 La Côte-de-Beaupré Regional County Municipality, a MRC
 Rivière du Malin
 Jacques-Cartier River
 Lac des Alliés
 Fragasso Lake
 Walsh Lake
 List of rivers of Quebec

External links 
 Réserve faunique des Laurentides

Rivers of Capitale-Nationale
La Côte-de-Beaupré Regional County Municipality
Laurentides Wildlife Reserve